Animal Atlas is a half-hour educational wildlife television series that "takes children on a tour of discovery, uncovering the secrets of how animals live and thrive. Young viewers meet animals from the familiar to the astounding, and the domesticated to the wild, including the diverse creatures of the African savanna, the finned and flippered of the big deep, and the colorful cast of the equatorial rainforest." The series is produced by Longneedle Entertainment, LLC, a subsidiary of Bellum Entertainment Group. It premiered in national syndication in 2004. As of 2018, 286 episodes had been produced, all in high-definition. Hearst Television's "Go Time!" program block broadcasts Animal Atlas to independent television stations across America.

Home video

In September 2008, LongNeedle partnered with home entertainment distributor NCircle Entertainment to release Animal Atlas on DVD and distribute the show online, with fourteen titles released by NCircle. The first DVD, Animal Passport, was released in December 2008. Fourteen Animal Atlas home entertainment titles have been released, including Puppy Party, Animal ABC's, Animal Atlas Family Time, Kitten Party, and Monkeying Around. The most recent release was Pet Party, in October 2012.

Season 9 episodes

References

External links
 
 

2004 American television series debuts
2015 American television series endings
2000s American children's television series
2010s American children's television series
American children's education television series
Nature educational television series
Television series about mammals
Television series about birds
Television series about reptiles and amphibians
Television series by Lionsgate Television
Television series by MGM Television
Television series by Sony Pictures Television
Qubo
American television series with live action and animation